Farmen 2018 (The Farm 2018) was the 14th season of the Norwegian version of The Farm reality television show. The show premiered on 25 September 2018 on TV 2 and ended on 9 December 2018.

Format
Fourteen contestants are chosen from the outside world. Each week one contestant is selected the Farmer of the Week. In the first week, the contestants choose the Farmer. Since week 2, the Farmer is chosen by the contestant evicted in the previous week.

Nomination process
The Farmer of the Week nominates two people (a man and a woman) as the Butlers. The others must decide which Butler is the first to go to the Battle. That person then chooses the second person (from the same sex) for the Battle and also the type of battle (a quiz, extrusion, endurance, sleight). The Battle winner must win two duels. The Battle loser is evicted from the game.

Finishing order
(ages stated are at time of contest)

Torpet 
For the first time in Farmen's history, contestants will be given a second chance to try and re-enter the competition. After their elimination, they are taken to Torpet where they will meet three former contestants of Farmen where the four of them will compete in a duel, where the loser is eliminated from the game. After a certain number of weeks, the last competitor to remain in Torpet will win a spot back into the game.

Torpet duels

Challengers 
Since 2014, during the fourth/fifth week, four challenges come to the farm where they live for one/two weeks. At the end, the contestants on the farm decide which two are allowed to stay on the farm. The others are eliminated and sent home.

The game

References

External links

The Farm (franchise)
Norwegian reality television series
2018 Norwegian television seasons